Henry Keep may refer to:

Henry Keep (American football) (1872–1965), American football coach
Henry Keep (businessman) (1818–1869), American financier
Henry Keep (politician) (1863–1897), Australian politician

See also
Henry Keepe (1652–1688), English antiquarian